John Bell Hood (1831–1879) was a Confederate States Army lieutenant general. General Hood may also refer to:

Alexander Hood, 1st Viscount Bridport (British Army officer) (1814–1904), British Army general
Jay W. Hood (fl. 1970s–2010s), U.S. Army major general
Michael Hood (fl. 1980s–2010s), Royal Canadian Air Force lieutenant general

See also
Jim Hood (born 1962), Attorney General of Mississippi